Sporting Clube Olhanense is a Portuguese sports club from Olhão, Algarve.

Its football team was founded on 27 April 1912 and currently plays in the Campeonato de Portugal, the fourth tier of Portuguese football. It holds home matches at the 5,661-spectator capacity Estádio José Arcanjo.

Olhanense won the Campeonato de Portugal (now Taça de Portugal) in 1924, their most prestigious honour in history.

History
Olhanense's earliest major honour was winning the 1923–24 Campeonato de Portugal (now Taça de Portugal), the largest football cup competition in Portugal. It also became the first team from the Algarve region to reach the top level of Portuguese football, after winning the Algarve Football Association in 1941. Among its achievements was a fourth-place finish in the 1945–46 season. In 1951, after ten consecutive seasons, the club returned to the second division.

Following this descent, the team only returned to the top flight for five seasons in the rest of the 20th century – three in the early 1960s and two in the mid-1970s – at time when rivals Farense and Portimonense had their most successful years. Managed by former Portugal international defender Jorge Costa, the team returned to the Primeira Liga as champions of the 2008–09 Liga de Honra by defeating Gondomar 1–0.

After five years in the top flight, Olhanense were relegated in May 2014 by finishing last in a season in which they had three managers. The result left the Algarve without a top-flight team. Three years later, the team finished last in the LigaPro, therefore falling out of the professional leagues for the first time in 13 years. For the first half of 2021, former Netherlands international Edgar Davids was the manager.

Rivalries
The club has rivalries with fellow Algarve clubs Farense and Portimonense.

Players

First-team squad

Honours

Domestic honours
Campeonato de Portugal
 Winners: 1923–24
Taça de Portugal
 Runners-up: 1944–45
 Segunda Liga
 Winners: 2008–09
 Segunda Divisão
 Winners: 1935–36, 1940–41, 2003–04
 Terceira Divisão
 Winners: 1969–70
 AF Algarve First Division
 Winners (16): 1921–22, 1923–24, 1924–25, 1925–26, 1926–27, 1930–31, 1932–33, 1938–39, 1939–40, 1940–41, 1941–42, 1942–43, 1943–44, 1944–45, 1945–46, 1946–47

Personnel honours
 LPFP Breakthrough Coach of the Year
 2008–09: Jorge Costa
 SJPF Young Player of the Month
 André Castro: September 2009, January 2010, February 2010
 Wilson Eduardo: September 2011
 André Pinto: November 2011
 Salvador Agra: March 2012

League and cup history

Managerial history

  Júlio Costa (1923–1925)
  Cassiano (1936–1940)
  Cassiano (1944–1945)
  Cassiano (1948–1949)
  Pepe Lopez (1950–1951)
  Armando Martins (1953–1954)
  Javier Mascaró (1954–1955)
  Rafael Pineda (1955–1956)
  José João (1957–1958)
  Joaquim Paulo (1958–1959)
  Artur Quaresma (1959–1960)
  Cassiano (1960–1961)
  Francisco André (1961)
  Chinita (1961–1962)
  Casaca (1962)
  Joaquim Paulo (1962–63)
  Armando Carneiro (1963)
  Chinita (1963–1964)
  Ruperto Garcia (1963–1964)
  Iosif Fabian (1964–1965)
  José Mendes (1964–1965)
  Severiano Correia (1965–1967)
  Genê (1967)
  Veríssimo Alves (1967–1968)
  Ruperto Garcia (1968–1969)
  Osvaldo Silva (1969–71)
  Orlando Ramín (1971–1972)
  Artur Santos (1972–1973)
  Jim Lopes (1973)
  Manuel de Oliveira (1973–1974)
  Joaquim Paulo (1974)
  Gonzalito (1974–1975)
  Alexandrino (1975)
  Marçal (1975–1976)
  Basora (1976)
  Milton Trinidad (1976–1977)
  János Hrotkó (1976–1977)
  Miguel Vinuesa (1977–1978)
  Carlos Sério (1978)
  János Hrotkó (1978–1979)
  Hélder Pereira (1979–1980)
  Miguel Vinuesa (1980)
  Júlio Amador (1980)
  Carlos Silva (1980–1984)
  Mário Lino (1984–1985)
  Manuel Cajuda(1985–1987)
  Álvaro Carolino (1987–1988)
  José Dinis (1988)
  Manuel Cajuda (1988–1989)
  Mário Wilson (1989–1990)
  Pedro Gomes (1990)
  Ademir Vieira (1990)
  Benvindo Assis (1990–1991)
  Ricardo Formosinho (1991)
  José Rocha (1991)
  Alberto Vivas (1991–1992)
  Ricardo Formosinho (1992)
  Carlos Silva (1992)
  Ademir Vieira (1992–1993)
  Stoycho Mladenov (1993–96)
  Fernando Mendes (1996)
  Plamen Lipenski (1996-1997)
  Zinho (1997)
  Manuel Balela (1997–99)
  Floris Schaap (1999–2000)
  Fanã (2000)
  Pitico (2000–2001)
  Horácio Gonçalves (2001)
  Vítor Urbano (2001–Mar, 2003)
  Rui Gorriz (Mar, 2003 – May 18, 2003)
  Paulo Sérgio (July 1, 2003 – May 16, 2006)
  Manuel Balela (July 15, 2006 – Oct 24, 2006)
  Álvaro Magalhães (Oct 24, 2006 – Dec 28, 2007)
  Diamantino Miranda (Jan 1, 2008 – May 26, 2008)
  Jorge Costa (June 16, 2008 – May 9, 2010)
  Daúto Faquirá (June 4, 2010 – Dec 30, 2011)
  Sérgio Conceição (Jan 2, 2012 – Jan 7, 2013)
  Manuel Cajuda (Jan 8, 2013 – May 1, 2013)
  Bruno Saraiva (May 1, 2013 – June 29, 2013)
  Abel Xavier (July 6, 2013 – Oct 28, 2013)
  Paulo Alves (Oct 29, 2013 – Jan 7, 2014)
  Giuseppe Galderisi (Jan 7, 2014 – July 7, 2014)
  Toni Conceição (July 7, 2014 – Oct 8, 2014)
  Jorge Paixão (Oct 8, 2014 – Feb 2, 2015)
  Cristiano Bacci (Feb 2, 2015 – Oct 27, 2016)
  Bruno Baltazar (Oct 28, 2016 – Feb 6, 2017)
  Bruno Saraiva (Feb 8, 2017 – Nov, 2017)
  Nilton Terroso (Nov 22, 2017 – June, 2018)
  Ivo Soares (July, 2018 – Feb, 2019)
  Vasco Faísca (Feb 5, 2019 – Dec 26, 2019)
  Bruno Ribeiro (Dec 31, 2019 – Feb 24, 2020)
  Filipe Moreira (Feb 25, 2020 – June 30, 2020)
  José Carvalho Araújo (July 9, 2020 – Dec 29, 2020)
  Edgar Davids (Jan 4, 2021–Jul 19, 2021)
  Carlo Perrone (Jul 24, 2021–)

References

External links
Official website

 
Football clubs in Portugal
Association football clubs established in 1912
1912 establishments in Portugal
Taça de Portugal winners
Primeira Liga clubs
Liga Portugal 2 clubs
Sport in Olhão